Charles John Howard (March 25, 1862 – May 13, 1928) was a legislator in both houses of the Ohio legislature around the turn of the nineteenth century. He was President of the Ohio Senate in 1915 and 1916.

Charles John Howard was born at Barnesville, Ohio on March 26, 1862. His father was Albertus B. Howard, a native of Frederick, Maryland. He graduated from Barnesville public schools, spent three years at Ohio State University and graduated from Cincinnati Law School. He practiced law at Barnesville, was Solicitor of Barnesville for twelve years, and served two terms on the board of education.

Howard was elected to the Ohio House of Representatives from Belmont County for the 72nd and 73rd General Assemblies, (1896 to 1899). He was later elected to the Ohio State Senate from the combined 20th - 22nd district for the 80th General Assembly, (1913 to 1914), where he was selected floor leader of the minority Republicans. He was re-elected to the 81st General Assembly, (1915 and 1916), and, with the Republicans in the majority, he was elected President Pro Tempore. He was unmarried when elected to the Senate. He died in a hospital at Baltimore, Maryland in 1928.

Notes

References

Ohio State University alumni
University of Cincinnati College of Law alumni
People from Barnesville, Ohio
Presidents of the Ohio State Senate
Republican Party Ohio state senators
1862 births
Republican Party members of the Ohio House of Representatives
1928 deaths